"What in the World's Come Over You" is a song written and performed by Jack Scott.  It was featured on his 1960 album What in the World's Come Over You. The song was produced by Sonny Lester

Chart performance
It reached #2 in Australia, #5 on the U.S. pop chart, #7 on the U.S. R&B chart, and #11 on the UK Singles Chart in 1960.  
The song ranked #14 on Billboard magazine's Top 100 singles of 1960.

Other charting versions
Sonny James released a version of the song as a single in 1975 which reached #3 on the Canadian country chart and #10 on the U.S. country chart.
Tom Jones released a version of the song as a single in 1981 which reached #25 on the U.S. country chart, #33 on the Canadian country chart, and #109 on the U.S. pop chart.

Other versions
Les Baxter released a version of the song on his 1960 album Young Pops.
Johnny Lee released a version of the song as the B-side to his 1974 single "So Nice to Be with You".
Tam White released a version of the song as a single in 1975 in the UK, which reached 36 on the chart.
Eddy Arnold released a version of the song on his 1990 compilation album Best of Eddy Arnold.
Wanda Jackson released a version of the song on her 1992 compilation album Let's Have a Party.
A version by Jim Reeves was released on the 2012 various artists album Country Chart Classics.

References

1959 songs
1959 singles
1975 singles
1981 singles
Sonny James songs
Tom Jones (singer) songs
Johnny Lee (singer) songs
Eddy Arnold songs
Wanda Jackson songs
Jim Reeves songs
Columbia Records singles
Mercury Records singles
RAK Records singles
Song recordings produced by Mickie Most
Songs written by Jack Scott (singer)